Annabel Nicola Croft (born 12 July 1966) is a British former professional tennis player and current radio and television presenter. As a tennis player she won the WTA Tour event Virginia Slims of San Diego and represented Great Britain in the Fed Cup and the Wightman Cup.

After retiring from tennis, she turned to television presenting, with such shows as Treasure Hunt and Interceptor. In 2005, she appeared in the ITV programme Celebrity Wrestling and went on to win it.

Most recently she has been a presenter for Eurosport, Sky Sports and the BBC.

Tennis career
Croft was born in Farnborough, Kent. After winning the Wimbledon and Australian Open girls' tournaments in 1984, she won the Virginia Slims of San Diego tournament in 1985, beating Wendy Turnbull in the final in straight sets. In December 1985, she achieved a world ranking of 24. She played for Great Britain in the Fed Cup in 1985 and 1986, and in the Wightman Cup from 1983 to 1986. She continued to play through February 1988, but failed to reach another final.

After tennis
Despite her potential and being amongst the world's top 25 players, Croft retired from professional tennis at the age of only twenty-one, tired of the relentless travel and feeling she no longer enjoyed playing. Immediately after her retirement, Croft became the new face of Channel 4's prime time show Treasure Hunt, following Anneka Rice's successful run. This was followed by her own show on ITV, Interceptor.

In 1990, Croft released her own fitness video entitled Annabel Croft's Shape Tape.

She has been involved in coverage of Wimbledon Tennis Championship for the BBC, Radio 5 Live and GMTV, and has also worked for Sky Sports and Eurosport as a tennis pundit. She has appeared on UK lifestyle TV shows such as The Wright Stuff, The Entertainment Show, GMTV, Out and About and This Morning.

In June 2009, Croft was one of five volunteers who took part in a BBC series of two programmes Famous, Rich and Homeless about living penniless on the streets of London. After Famous, Rich and Homeless Croft did a follow-on Radio 5 Live radio show which was broadcast on 24 and 25 December 2009, entitled James: My Alcoholic Friend, where she tries to track down the rough sleeper with whom she had spent a night on the streets.

In May 2012, Croft gave a speech at the Oxford Union in which, after talking about her tennis and media presenter careers, she spoke at length of her 3-day experience of living on the streets and the friendship she had formed with James during that time.

She is a presenter for Sky Sports, including the 2012 US Open. She has also presented Game, Set & Mats on Eurosport during Grand Slam tournament weeks of tennis.

In October 2012, Croft launched a company called DiaryDoll with TV presenter Carol Smillie, retailing waterproof pants for periods, post-maternity and pelvic-floor weakness, with an aim to be pretty, feminine, breathable and washproof whilst reducing stigma of the topic of women's pelvic health.

Personal life
Croft is married to Mel Coleman, a former international yachtsman and current investment banker. The couple live in Coombe, near Wimbledon, in the London borough of Kingston, with their three children. She is a member of the All England Lawn Tennis and Croquet Club.

Croft has been active in raising awareness of child obesity, and is a supporter of the children's cancer charity CLIC Sargent.

WTA career finals

Grand Slam performance timelines

Singles

Doubles

Mixed doubles

National team participation

Fed Cup

References

External links
 Official website
 
 
 

1966 births
Living people
Tennis people from Greater London
English female tennis players
British female tennis players
English sports broadcasters
English television presenters
Reality show winners
Tennis commentators
Australian Open (tennis) junior champions
Wimbledon junior champions
Grand Slam (tennis) champions in girls' singles